A Spiritist centre, also called Spiritist society or Spiritist house, is the basic unit of organisation of Spiritism, which is a distinct form of Spiritualism.

In legal terms, Spiritist centres are ordinary non-profit associations, whose members are in charge of providing funds to run the centre itself and the various charity activities kept by it. Each centre is run by a president or one or more directors elected for a term. Spiritist centres differ from Spiritualist churches in that they are not formally organized as ecclesiastical bodies.

In addition to the legal and corporeal aspects of its existence, a Spiritist centre is also believed by its members to have an informal and incorporeal level of existence in the spirit world which comprises its patron and a series of protector spirits (which may be shared by other centres in the world).

Types of societies

There are many types of Spiritist organisations, depending on their goals, formal organisation, size, etc.

 Familiar societies (often termed Spiritist Groups)  do not have legal existence and conduct their meetings in private homes. Most of the social works provided by such societies is also informal and irregular.
 Public societies (the Spiritist centres in the proper sense) must have legal existence and host their meetings in dedicated buildings. They have a fairly large number of members (ranging from about 100 to thousands) and usually provide significant social work, in form of schools, clinics, food distribution for the poor, etc.
 Regional and national entities are groups that organise and coordinate the activities of Spiritism state or nationwide.
 Virtual societies; these exist only on the internet and provide basic services, including directories of actual meeting places as outlined above.

Activities
Spiritist centres are complex to define because they are not, in the strictest sense, ordinary religious entities. The activities carried on by a Spiritist centres are of many types:

Formation
Spiritist centre may be founded by anyone well-versed in Spiritist doctrine.

Courses of Instruction
Doctrinal classes have a twofold goal: 1) to share the knowledge available in the books and brought by the founders 2) to identify potential mediums and workers.

Most Spiritist centres conduct the following courses:

 Basic course for beginners—intended for newcomers, are based on the general aspects of the doctrine.
 Study of The Spirits Book
 Study of The Mediums Book
 Studies of the Gospels and/or The Gospel According to Spiritism
 Advanced studies (including The Genesis According to Spiritism, Heaven and Hell, and works of other writers, like Léon Denis, Chico Xavier, Gabriel Delanne and others, which are regarded as complementary to Allan Kardec.
 Basic course for children
 Short courses—meetings in which other books are studied.

The first three courses are almost universal.

Proselytism

The only form of proselytism found in Spiritism is the disclosure of the doctrine (or aspects of it) to the general public. Divulgation of doctrine is carried on in many ways:

 Workshops
 Radio transmissions
 Websites
 Staging of plays featuring the doctrine
 Management of a public library containing mostly books on the doctrine or written by mediums

Spiritual assistance

Spiritists understand the term Spiritual assistance very literally, meaning "assistance to the spirit" of either a living person or a deceased one.

Spiritual assistance offered at Spiritist centres includes disobsession, healing, and blessing (directed to the followers and occasional visitors) as well as medium meetings in which several types of spiritual assistance is directed to spirits of deceased people.

Spiritual assistance is intended to fight the four greatest foes of mankind -- suicide, murder (which includes abortion), addiction and envy (which is the cause of most other problems) -- thus reducing the suffering of mankind.

The ultimate goal of spiritual assistance is to help our planet to make it through its current stage of evolution, ceasing to be a world of penance to become a happier one.

Material assistance
Spiritist centres also carry on social works directed to outsiders which are "in need of help". Material assistance is intended to provide relief to the immediate needs of the poor and the unhappy.

In Brazil, Spiritist centres characteristically maintain the following types of charities:

 Creches
 Kindergartens
 Orphanages
 Distribution of food for the homeless
 Distribution of medicines for the ill (including contraceptives for the poor)

Bigger centres may keep clinics, schools, publishing houses, etc.

In spite of their respect for homoeopathy, the kind of medicine practised in clinics maintained by spiritist centres and the medicines they give to the poor are both nearly always mainstream.

External links
 Spiritist Society of Baltimore
 Spiritist Society of San Diego
 Portal do Espírito, a virtual Spiritism society based in Brazil
 Enmore Spiritualist Church, an Australian Spiritualist church

Centre, Spiritist